Matteo Rabottini (born 14 August 1987) is an Italian racing cyclist, who currently rides for UCI Continental team .

Career
He was provisionally suspended by the UCI in September 2014 following an adverse analytical finding for EPO in a test taken in August 2014. He was dropped from the Italian World Championships team. In May 2015 UCI announced on their website that Rabottini was banned for two years, with a cut of 3 months for "Substantial Assistance in Discovering or Establishing Anti-Doping Rule Violations". The ban ended on 6 May 2016. He joined  upon the conclusion of the ban.

Major results

2009
 1st  Road race, National Under-23 Road Championships
2010
 10th Overall Girobio
1st Stage 10
2011
 1st Stage 5 Tour of Turkey
2012
 Giro d'Italia
1st  Mountains classification
1st Stage 15
 3rd Coppa Sabatini
 3rd Gran Premio Bruno Beghelli
 5th Overall Tour of Slovenia
 6th Giro dell'Emilia
 7th Overall Giro di Padania
 10th GP Industria & Artigianato di Larciano
2013
 9th Tre Valli Varesine
 9th Milano–Torino
2014
 3rd Road race, National Road Championships
 3rd Overall Settimana Internazionale di Coppi e Bartali
 3rd Overall Tour of Slovenia
4th Overall Vuelta a Burgos
 4th Gran Premio della Costa Etruschi
 9th Trofeo Laigueglia
2017
 6th Overall Tour of Albania
2018
 5th Overall Tour of Albania

References

External links

1987 births
Living people
Italian male cyclists
Doping cases in cycling
Italian sportspeople in doping cases
Sportspeople from Pescara
Italian Giro d'Italia stage winners
Presidential Cycling Tour of Turkey stage winners
Cyclists from Abruzzo